Olga Vasilyevna Mostepanova (born 3 January 1970) is a retired former Soviet gymnast. She won three gold medals at the World Championships.

Personal life 
Mostepanova's birth year has been variously reported as 1968 or 1969. She herself stated that she was born on 3 January 1970 in Moscow.

She is married and the mother of five children.

Gymnastics career
A native of Moscow, Mostepanova began gymnastics at the age of 5 when her mother took her to the Dinamo club for a tryout. She remained at Dinamo, where she trained under coach Anna Anikina and later Vladimir Aksyonov. At the age of 10 she placed 7th all-around at the USSR Junior Championships and was named to the Soviet junior national team.

Over the next few years Mostepanova would become known as one of the promising gymnasts of the Soviet team. She enjoyed success in various junior international events, including the 1980 Champions All meet and the 1982 Junior European Championships, where she won the balance beam title, placed second on the vault and third in the all-around. She had a strong senior debut in 1983, winning two gold medals (team, balance beam) and two silvers (all-around, floor exercise) at the 1983 World Championships.

Mostepanova was considered an excellent medal prospect for the 1984 Olympics; however, due to the Eastern Bloc boycott, she did not compete in the Games. She led the Soviet team at the Friendship Games (also known as Olomouc, after the city in which the gymnastics competition was held; or the Alternate Games), the "alternative Olympics" for countries that had participated in the boycott. Olomouc was an exceptional competition for Mostepanova. In the all-around, she became the only gymnast in history to earn 10.0 scores on all four events in a major international competition, finishing the session with a perfect mark of 40.0. She nearly achieved this feat in both the qualifying round and the team finals as well, earning 10.0s on three of her four events. In total, Mostepanova earned twelve 10s in Olomouc and left with five of the six possible gold medals: team, all-around, vault, balance beam and floor exercise.

After the Friendship Games, she continued to compete, sharing in the team gold medal at the 1985 World Championships. She qualified for the all-around, but she and teammate Irina Baraksanova were pulled from the competition by the team coaches and replaced by Oksana Omelianchik and Elena Shushunova. This would be her last major meet for the USSR.

In a recent poll in Inside Gymnastics magazine, she was voted one of the "Top 10 All-Around Gymnasts of All Time".

Eponymous skill
Mostepanova has one eponymous skill listed in the Code of Points.

Achievements

Sources

Year of birth uncertain
Living people
Russian female artistic gymnasts
Soviet female artistic gymnasts
World champion gymnasts
Medalists at the World Artistic Gymnastics Championships
Age controversies
Gymnasts from Moscow
1970 births
Originators of elements in artistic gymnastics